The AARP Movies for Grownups Award for Best Buddy Picture is one of the AARP Movies for Grownups Awards presented annually by the AARP. The award honors the best film from a given year that is about friendship between people over the age of 50. The award for Best Buddy Picture was first given at the 7th AARP Movies for Grownups Awards. Other new awards that year were Best Supporting Actor and Best Supporting Actress.

No award for Best Buddy Picture was given for movies premiering in 2011, 2017, or 2018. In 2020, AARP listed five nominees for Best Buddy Picture from 2019, but did not award any of them.

Winners and Nominees

2000s

2010s

2020s

Footnotes

References

Buddy Picture